Van Norman Lake is a private, all-sports, 66-acre lake along the main branch of the Clinton River, in Oakland County, in the U.S. state of Michigan. 
Most of the lake lies within Independence Township; however, the southern portion of the lake is in Waterford Township.

The lake was formed when a dam was built in the late 19th century on the Clinton River near Dixie Highway and Andersonville Road.  Prior to then, a small pond existed in Waterford Village on the southeastern shore.

The  lake currently has one island.  There were three islands as late as the 1980s; however, two have since disappeared due to erosion.

Van Norman Lake connects upstream to Lester Lake (12 acres) and Greens Lake (117 acres) to the east and downstream to Townsend Lake (26 acres) and Woodhull Lake (135 acres) to the west.

Van Norman Lake is the deepest lake in Independence Township and the sixth-deepest of the 387 lakes in Oakland County.

Namesake
Van Norman Lake was named for Zenas Harvey Van Norman, who owned the property along the entire northern shore of the lake from 1886 to 1916.  That property was section 32 in Independence Township, Michigan, also known as Waterford Hill.  With an elevation of 1,150 feet, his property was the second highest point in Independence Township.

Zenas Van Norman was born on January 1, 1822, in Nelson Township, Halton County, Ontario, Canada to Abraham Van Norman (b. Jan 30, 1791 - d. Nov 2, 1879) and Charity (Cummins) Van Norman (b. Oct 17, 1795 - d. Aug 17, 1876).

On September 13, 1847, he married Mary Ann France (b. Dec 5, 1825 - d. Oct 18, 1883) and together they had three daughters; Eva Caroline (b. Feb 18, 1851 - d. May 31, 1874), Margaret (b. Jun 23, 1853 - d. Jul 6, 1940) and Bessie Louise (b. Apr 4, 1865 - d. Jun 2, 1946).

Van Norman was a fruit grower by trade.  He called his Independence Township property Van Norman Farm Resort. There, he grew over fifty varieties of fruit trees.

Zenas Van Norman died on December 20, 1917, in Waterford, Michigan.  He is buried in Hagaman Cemetery in Lenawee County, Michigan, with his wife Mary and daughter Eva.

Prior to being named Van Norman Lake, the lake was called Mill Pond.

Fish
Fish in Van Norman Lake include pumpkinseed sunfish, largemouth bass, walleye, northern pike and crappie.

References

Lakes of Oakland County, Michigan
Lakes of Michigan
Lakes of Waterford Township, Michigan
Lakes of Independence Township, Michigan